Scopula latifera is a moth of the  family Geometridae. It is found in the Democratic Republic of Congo.

References

Moths described in 1869
latifera
Moths of Africa